The Cognizant Founders Cup is a women's professional golf tournament on the LPGA Tour in Clifton, New Jersey. It debuted in 2011 at the Wildfire Golf Club at JW Marriott Phoenix Desert Ridge Resort and Spa in Phoenix, Arizona. The tournament is designed as a tribute to the founders of the LPGA. 

The current title sponsor of the tournament is Cognizant, an American multinational technology company that provides business consulting, information technology, and outsourcing services.

In 2011, using a unique format conducted for the first time in LPGA history, the players did not receive a cash payout. Instead, the tournament donated half of the $1 million tournament purse to charity and the other half to individual charities chosen by the top-10 finishers. All players who made the cut received a portion of the purse in the form of virtual earnings that were attributed to them for purposes of the LPGA official money list.

In 2012, the tournament expanded from three days to four days, and an actual cash purse was instituted.

Volvik took over sponsorships rights for the tournament in 2020, but the tournament was not played due to the COVID-19 pandemic.

Tournament names
2011–2013: RR Donnelley LPGA Founders Cup
2014–2016: JTBC Founders Cup
2017–2019: Bank of Hope Founders Cup
2020: Volvik Founders Cup
2021–present: Cognizant Founders Cup

Winners

1 In 2011, $500,000 of the purse went LPGA-USGA Girls Golf and $500,000 went to the top-10 finishers’ designated charities.All winnings were attributed to the players for purposes of the 2011 LPGA Official money list.

Tournament records

References

External links

Coverage on the LPGA Tour's official site
Mountain Ridge Country Club – course website

LPGA Tour events
Golf in Arizona